The City Hall Historic District is a historic district in Lowell, Massachusetts, bound roughly by Broadway, Colburn, and Kirk streets. The centerpiece of the district is the Richardsonian Romanesque City Hall, built in 1893 to a design by Merrill & Cutler, with its  clock tower.

The district features Greek Revival and Romanesque Revival architecture, including work by Kirk Boott. City Hall Historic District was added to the National Register of Historic Places in 1975, and expanded in 1988.

Gallery

See also
National Register of Historic Places listings in Lowell, Massachusetts

References

Historic districts in Lowell, Massachusetts
National Register of Historic Places in Lowell, Massachusetts
Historic districts on the National Register of Historic Places in Massachusetts